Whitfield is a masculine given name borne by:

 Whitfield Connor (1916–1988), American actor, director and producer
 Whitfield Cook (1909–2003), American writer of screenplays, stage plays, short stories and novels
 Whitfield Crane (born 1968), American rock singer
 Whitfield Daukes (1877–1954), Anglican bishop
 Whitfield Diffie (born 1944), American cryptographer and mathematician
 Whitfield Jack (1906–1989), US Army officer
 Whitfield Lovell (born 1959), African-American artist

English-language masculine given names